The Aga Khan Foundation (AKF) is a private, not-for-profit international development agency, which was founded in 1967  by Shah Karim Al Hussaini, Aga Khan IV, the 49th Hereditary Imam of the Shia Ismaili Muslims. AKF seeks to provide long-term solutions to problems of poverty, hunger, illiteracy and ill health in the poorest parts of South and Central Asia, Eastern and Western Africa, and the Middle East. In these regions, the needs of rural communities in mountainous, coastal and resource poor areas are given particular attention. The Foundation's activities often reinforce the work of other sister agencies within the Aga Khan Development Network (AKDN). While these agencies are guided by different mandates pertaining to their respective fields of expertise (the environment, culture, microfinance, health, education, architecture, rural development), their activities are often coordinated with one another in order to "multiply" the overall effect that the Network has in any given place or community. AKF also collaborates with local, national and international partners in order to bring about sustainable improvements of life in the 19 countries in which it works. The Foundation's head office is located in Geneva, Switzerland.

Areas of focus
The Foundation concentrates its resources on selected issues in health, education, rural development, environment and the strengthening of civil society. Seeking innovative approaches to generic problems, it tries to identify solutions that can be adapted to conditions in many different regions and replicated.

Cross-cutting issues that are also addressed by the Foundation include human resource development, community participation, and gender and development.

Funding and grant making
The Aga Khan Foundation is the principal grant-making agency for social development within the Aga Khan Development Network. Grants are normally given to local organizations interested in testing new solutions, in learning from experience and in being agents of lasting change. These organizations must share the Foundation's and Development Network's goals in their specific areas of focus. If no established group exists, the Foundation occasionally creates new organizations to tackle particularly important problems.

The Aga Khan provides the Foundation with regular funding for administration as well as making contributions to its endowment. The Ismaili community contributes volunteers, time, professional services and substantial financial resources. Other funding sources include income from investments and grants from government, institutional and private sector partners, as well as donations from individuals around the world.

One programme series funded by the Foundation was the BBC World News television series Architects on the Frontline, which was about entries to the Aga Khan Award for Architecture competition, and was criticized by the media watchdog Ofcom for breaking United Kingdom broadcasting rules; viewers were not informed that the series, which praised the competition, was sponsored content.

Awards and recognition
Among other recognition for its work, the Foundation received the 2005 Award for Most Innovative Development Project from the Global Development Network for the Aga Khan Rural Support Programme (AKRSP). The AKRSP has successfully been replicated to form the Rural Support Programmes Network in Pakistan.

Geographic focus
The Foundation normally intervenes where it has a strong volunteer base. It is currently active in the following countries: Afghanistan, Bangladesh, Canada, Egypt, India, Kenya, Kyrgyzstan, Madagascar, Mozambique, Pakistan, Portugal, Switzerland, Syria, Tajikistan, Tanzania, Uganda, United Kingdom, and United States.

References

Sources
AKF and AKDN: A Continuum of Development

External links

Foundation
Organizations established in 1967
Rural community development
Islamic relief organizations